Chehel Gacheh (also Romanized as Chehel Gācheh; also known as Chehel Kācheh) is a village in Khara Rud Rural District, in the Central District of Siahkal County, Gilan Province, Iran. At the 2006 census, its population was 76, in 17 families.

References 

Populated places in Siahkal County